Buckaroo Blue Grass II – Riding Song is the twenty-ninth album by American singer-songwriter Michael Martin Murphey, and his second album of bluegrass music.

Track listing

Credits
Music
 Michael Martin Murphey – vocals, acoustic guitar, executive producer
 Ryan Murphey – acoustic guitar, producer
 Pat Flynn – lead acoustic guitar
 Audie Blaylock – lead acoustic guitar
 Andy Hall – dobro
 Rob Ickes – dobro
 Charlie Cushman – banjo
 Ronnie McCoury – mandolin
 Sam Bush – mandolin
 Troy Engle – mandolin, fiddle
 Andy Leftwich – mandolin, fiddle
 Craig Nelson – acoustic bass
 Matt Pierson – bass

Production
 Keith Compton – engineer, mastering
 Benny Quinn – mastering
 Stoker White – assistant

Chart performance

References

External links
 Michael Martin Murphey's Official Website

2010 albums
Bluegrass albums
Michael Martin Murphey albums
Sequel albums